Sharif Kandi may refer to:
 Sharif Kandi, Kurdistan
 Sharif Kandi, West Azerbaijan